Bacidia sachalinensis is a little-known species of corticolous (bark-dwelling) lichen in the family Ramalinaceae. Found in the Russian Far East, it was formally described as a new species in 2018 by Julia Gerasimova, Aleksandr Ezhkin, and Andreas Beck. The type specimen was collected by the second author near the Rogatka River in Yuzhno-Sakhalinsk (Sakhalin Oblast), where it was found growing on the bark of Populus maximowiczii in a floodplain forest; it has only been documented from this location. The species epithet refers to its type locality.

References

Ramalinaceae
Lichen species
Lichens described in 2018
Lichens of the Russian Far East